The 1940 Missouri Tigers football team was an American football team that represented the University of Missouri in the Big Six Conference (Big 6) during the 1940 college football season. The team compiled a 6–3 record (3–2 against Big 6 opponents), finished in third place in the Big 6, and outscored all opponents by a combined total of 213 to 135. Don Faurot was the head coach for the sixth of 19 seasons. The team played its home games at Memorial Stadium in Columbia, Missouri.

The team's leading scorer was Harry Ice with 42 points.

Schedule

References

Missouri
Missouri Tigers football seasons
Missouri Tigers football